Convoy LN-7 was a trade convoy of merchant ships during the Second World War. It was one of the numbered LN convoys from  Quebec City to Goose Bay, Labrador.

Background

The March 1942 St. Lawrence Conference reviewed plans for convoy defence against U-boats in the Gulf of St. Lawrence and the St. Lawrence River as well as establishing a base at Gaspé, Quebec for the St. Lawrence patrol force, named Gaspé Force. However, by Spring 1942 the only deterrent active within the St. Lawrence were air patrols. In early May, the first U-boat arrived in the St. Lawrence, . It entered the Gulf of St. Lawrence and sank two merchant vessels.

Following the attacks, all independent sailings were cancelled and a convoy system was adopted. As a result of merchant ship losses in the Atlantic Ocean, many slow lake freighters, vessels built for shipping on the Great Lakes, had been brought into service supplying St. Lawrence ports.

In 1942, there were increased demands for the protection of shipping as new convoy systems were created. Protection of convoys bringing material and workers to Goose Bay, Labrador for the construction of a large Royal Canadian Air Force base was required. The convoys would depart Quebec and bring the material to the drop off point at Hamilton Inlet in Labrador and the return trip would be made by the now-empty vessels. To provide escort for the new convoys, two s were reassigned from tanker escort duty in July 1942.

The , commanded by Kapitänleutnant Paul Hartwig, had entered the Gulf of St. Lawrence on the night of 26–27 August 1942. On 27 August, U-517 torpedoed the United States Army transport Chatham in the Strait of Belle Isle. On 28 August, the U-boat sank the abandoned hulk Arlyn in the strait. These attacks, and those by  led to the cancellation of the sailing of LN-6, which was composed of the corvette Trail and the merchant vessels Ericus and Donald Stewart.

Ships in the convoy

Merchant ships
LN-7 was composed of three merchant vessels. Canatco had sailed from Quebec with the escort Shawinigan with Ericus, Donald Stewart and the escort Trail joining from convoy LN 6 off Gaspé which had been cancelled after U-boat attacks in the Strait of Belle Isle. Donald Stewart was a Great Lakes freighter carrying cement and 55-gallon drums of aviation gasoline lashed to its deck. After the groups had merged, the three merchant ships sailed in a line abreast.

Escorts
Shawinigan was the initial escort assigned to the convoy. Trail joined from convoy LN-6 after it had been cancelled due to U-boat attacks in the Strait of Belle Isle. Once the two groups had merged, a corvette was positioned ahead of the convoy on each flank.

Battle
On 1 September Trail, Ericus and Donald Stewart departed Gaspé to join LN-7 as it passed on its way to Hamilton Inlet. The convoy was spotted by U-517 off Anticosti Island on 2 September, but was prevented from attacking right away by the appearance of a Canso aircraft from No. 117 Squadron RCAF. Hartwig then navigated ahead of the convoy, intending to attack later in the day.

The escorts of the two convoys were concentrating on keeping the convoys apart. It was during this meeting at 03:00 on 3 September that U-517 commenced a surface attack on the convoy, firing into convoy LN-7 from its southern flank. As the submarine fired two torpedoes, it was caught on the surface by Weyburn. The corvette sought to ram, but not being fast enough to catch up to the surfaced submarine, opened fire with its  forward gun. This action forced Hartwig to submerge. Weyburn then made a depth charge attack and sought to find the U-boat using its asdic, but made no contact.

One torpedo struck the merchant Donald Stewart forward of the stern, the other missed. The torpedo that struck ignited the gasoline causing flames to rise from the merchant " and spreading from stem to stern." 16 of 19 crew were recovered by Shawinigan with Clayoquot and Trail screening the operation. Hartwig had decided against a second attack on the convoys following Weyburns attempt to ram and remained submerged.

Aftermath
U-517 continued to track LN-7 towards the Strait of Belle Isle. Following U-517s attack, air cover was strengthened in the area and beginning on 3 September, a Digby bomber from No. 10 Squadron RCAF was deployed to the area. The Digby caught U-517 on the surface and dropped four depth charges, missing with all of them. One of the depth charges blew up on contact with the water and fragments damaged the wing of the aircraft. The U-boat submerged before the depth charges hit and suffered no damage. Thirty minutes after the air attack, Trail arrived on scene and U-517 and turned towards Anticosti Island. Further U-boat attacks on convoys, with the strongest on 6 September on Convoy QS-33, transiting the Gulf and St. Lawrence River would force the Royal Canadian Navy to dedicate more powerful ships to convoy escort. On 9 September, the Royal Canadian Navy informed the Allies that St. Lawrence ports were to be closed to international shipping.

Notes

References

Bibliography

External links
The story of LN-7 at veterans.gc.ca

North American Coastal convoys of World War II